Khyargas is a sum (district) of Uvs Province in western Mongolia.

The sum is named after Khyargas lake, which is 80 km south of the sum center.

The sum center was formerly located at another site, .

Populated places in Mongolia
Districts of Uvs Province